Psychrobacter pocilloporae is a Gram-negative, rod-shaped and aerobic bacterium of the genus Psychrobacter which has been isolated from the coral Pocillopora eydouxi from the Andaman Sea in India.

References

External links
Type strain of Psychrobacter pocilloporae at BacDive -  the Bacterial Diversity Metadatabase

Moraxellaceae
Bacteria described in 2016